E 981 is a European B class road in Turkey, connecting the cities of Afyon and Pozantı.

Route 
 
Afyon – Konya – Aksaray – Pozantı

References

External links 
 UN Economic Commission for Europe: Overall Map of E-road Network (2007)

International E-road network
Roads in Turkey